Genital cutting refers to genital modification and mutilation of the human genitals using a cutting instrument.  This terminology is often used in some literature specifically to avoid using the terms 'mutilation' or 'circumcision'. These practices can include:
 Castration
 Circumcision (male)
 Clitoridectomy
 Female genital mutilation (FGM)
 Penectomy
 Labiaplasty
 Penile subincision
 Penile superincision
 Sex reassignment of intersex children
 Vaginoplasty

Genital modification and mutilation